Deceptions II: Edge of Deception is a 1995 drama film directed by George Mihalka, written by Ken Denbow, starring Mariel Hemingway, Stephen Shellen and Jennifer Rubin. It is the sequel to the 1990 film Deceptions.

Plot
A detective gets involved with a reporter.

Cast 
 Mariel Hemingway as Joan Branson 
 Stephen Shellen as Lieutenant Nick Gentry
 Jennifer Rubin as Irene Stadler
 Wally Dalton as Detective Rains
 Vladimir Kulich as Allan Stadler
 Ken Roberts as Captain Harrelson
 Zachary Throne as Artie Samson

References

External links 
 
 

1995 films
1995 drama films
1995 thriller films
1990s thriller drama films
American sequel films
American thriller drama films
1990s English-language films
Films directed by George Mihalka
1990s American films